Edwin John Booth  (born 1955) is the chairman of British supermarket chain Booths which was founded in 1847 by his great-great-grandfather Edwin Henry Booth.

He joined Booths in 1973, on leaving school, and became executive chairman in 1997 and chairman and CEO in 2017.

In 2010 Lancaster University awarded him an honorary LLD, describing him as "a highly successful local businessman whose career embodies the skills and values necessary for success in a highly competitive commercial environment."

He was chair of the Lancashire Local enterprise partnership from 2011 to 2018.

He was appointed C.B.E. "For services to business and charity" in the 2019 New Year Honours.

He was appointed as Deputy Lieutenant of Lancashire in 2005, and was High Sheriff of Lancashire for the year starting in April 2021.

References

External links

Year of birth missing (living people)
Living people
English businesspeople in retailing
Businesspeople from Lancashire